Bangkok, Thailand, has an extensive water transport system serving passengers crossing or travelling along the Chao Phraya River as well as certain canals. 
 The Chao Phraya Express Boat service is a water bus which carries passengers along the Chao Phraya, regularly serving  thirty-four stops from Rat Burana to Nonthaburi.
 The MINE Smart Ferry is an electric water bus service that operates three routes across Bangkok and Nonthaburi
 Ferries operate at thirty-two crossings of the Chao Phraya within Bangkok, as well as Nonthaburi and Samut Prakan Provinces.
 Long-tail boats serve fifteen regular routes along the Chao Phraya.
 The Khlong Saen Saep boat service travels along Saen Saep Canal, serving twenty-seven stops from Wat Si Bun Rueang to Phan Fa Lilat.
 The Khlong Phra Khanong boat service serves thirteen stops along the Phra Khanong Canal from Iam Sombat to Phra Khanong.
 The Khlong Phasi Charoen boat service travels along Phasi Charoen Canal.
 The Rangsit Canal boat service travels along Rangsit Canal.
 The 5.5 km klong Phadung Krungkasem boat service (old city).

In April 2014, the BMA initiated a trial service of passenger boats along Phasi Charoen Canal. The BMA is also considering developing passenger boat services along twenty-eight other canals following the six-month test run.

References